No Time for Love may refer to:
No Time for Love (EP), an EP by Eighteen Visions
No Time for Love (1943 film), a romantic comedy film
Lucky: No Time for Love, a 2005 Hindi-language film
No Time for Love (2009 film), a Danish film, starring Tuva Novotny

See also
 A Time for Love (disambiguation)